The Catalina affair was a military confrontation and Cold War-era diplomatic crisis in June 1952, in which Soviet Air Force fighter jets shot down two Swedish aircraft over international waters in the Baltic Sea.

The first aircraft to be shot down was an unarmed Swedish Air Force Tp 79, a derivative of the Douglas DC-3, carrying out radio and radar signals intelligence-gathering for the National Defence Radio Establishment (Försvarets radioanstalt, FRA). None of the crew of eight survived.

The second aircraft to be shot down was a Swedish Air Force Tp 47, a Catalina flying boat, involved in the search and rescue operation for the missing DC-3. The Catalina's crew of five were saved.

The Soviet Union publicly denied involvement until its dissolution in 1991. Both aircraft were located in 2003; the DC-3 was salvaged.

Aircraft and crew

DC-3 
The first aircraft involved was a Swedish Air Force Douglas DC-3A-360 Skytrain, a military transport derivative of the DC-3 known in Swedish service as Tp 79. It carried the serial number 79001. In the media coverage following the event, it became known simply as "the DC-3."

The aircraft was manufactured in 1943 with original US serial number 42-5694, and was delivered to USAAF 15th Troop Carrier Squadron (61st Troop Carrier Group). It saw action in northern Africa before being stationed at RAF Barkston Heath. It was flown on 5 February 1946, from Orly Air Base via Hanau Army Airfield to Bromma and was registered as SE-APZ on 18 May 1946 as a civil aircraft to Skandinaviska Aero AB.

On 13 June 1952, it disappeared east of the isle of Gotska Sandön while carrying out signals intelligence-gathering operations for FRA. The aircraft was lost with its entire crew of eight in the incident. Three of the eight crew members were military personnel from the Swedish Air Force, and the other five were civilian signals intelligence (SIGINT) operators from the FRA.

Catalina 

Three days after the initial incident, on 16 June 1952, two Consolidated PBY-5 Catalina flying boats, known in Swedish service as Tp 47, searched for the DC-3 north of Estonia. One of the aircraft, carrying airframe serial No. 47002, was shot down by Soviet aircraft, but the crew of five ditched near the West German freighter Münsterland and were rescued.

Aftermath 
Sweden maintained for nearly 40 years that the plane was undertaking a navigation training flight.

Only after pressure from crewmembers' families did Swedish authorities confirm that the DC-3 was equipped with British equipment and had been conducting surveillance for NATO. In 1991, General , a colonel in the early 1950s, admitted he had ordered the DC-3 shot down in 1952 by scrambling a MiG-15bis to intercept it.

Recovery 
On 10 June 2003, airline captain and former Swedish Air Force pilot, Anders Jallai, and historian Carl Douglas with the Swedish company Marin Mätteknik AB found the remains of the downed DC-3 by using sonar at  depth.

After 52 years, the remains of the DC-3 were lifted to the surface on 19 March 2004. Debris from the area was also recovered by freeze dredging.  of surrounding sediment was frozen and lifted together with the object on and in it. The wreck was transferred to Muskö naval base for investigation and preservation; it was finally put on display at the Swedish Air Force Museum, Linköping on 13 May 2009. A 1:12 scale model of 79001 was loaned to the Air Force Museum on 5 May 2009.

Conclusion 

Bullet holes on 79001 showed that the DC-3 was shot down by a MiG-15bis fighter. The exact splashdown time was also determined, as one of the clocks in the cockpit had stopped at 11:28:40 CET. The remains of four of the eight-man crew have been found and positively identified.

See also 
"Whiskey on the rocks"

Further reading 
Agrell, Wilhelm. 2021. Catalinaaffären. Historiska Media.

Notes

References 

 

Military history of Sweden
Cold War military history of the Soviet Union
Cold War intelligence operations
1952 in military history
Gotland
Aviation accidents and incidents in the Soviet Union
20th-century aircraft shootdown incidents
Soviet Union–Sweden relations
1952 in the Soviet Union
1952 in international relations
Aviation accidents and incidents in Sweden
1952 in Sweden
Aviation accidents and incidents in 1952
Accidents and incidents involving the Consolidated PBY Catalina
June 1952 events in Europe
Accidents and incidents involving the Douglas C-47 Skytrain